Coni may refer to:
Cuneo, Italy
Coni, Azerbaijan
Italian National Olympic Committee